Initiation Tape - Part One is the fourth studio album by American electronic musician Vektroid under her New Dreams Ltd. alias. The album has mixed reviews but is still popular among Vektroid fans. The album was reissued in 2014 as Initiation Tape: Isle of Avalon Edition, featuring a different tracklist as well as new artwork (an image of the 'King Corner Suite' at the ANA InterContinental Hotel located in Minato, Tokyo, Japan). This version was uploaded to Vektroid's Bandcamp page, however it has since been removed. The album samples music from the 1960s, 1970s, and 1980s.

Track listing

Notes

 The introduction tracks from Part One, "Forever? (Introduction, Pt. 1)" and "Midnight Luvr (Introduction, Pt. 2)" were combined into the track "Forever", as seen in the reissue.
 The tracks from Part One, "Camaro" and "PSR41" were combined into the track "Dedication", as seen in the reissue.
 The tracks from Part One, "Hydrocone / Prom Night" and "You Appeared / You Didn't" were combined into the track "Cold Water", as seen in the reissue.
 The tracks from Part One, "Meditations Save Me O Lord" and "Upper Spheres Of Consciousness" were combined into the track "Meditations", as seen in the reissue.
 The last track from Part One, "New Life Now! Please" was never used in the reissue, unlike the rest of the tracks.
 The tracks from the reissue, "Feel" (which sampled "Fire on the Water" (1986) by Chris De Burgh), "Sky Nouveau" (sampled "Any Love" (1988) by Luther Vandross), "Harem", "Pine Forest Surf", "Nimbus Lab After Hours", "Asleep In The Ice Cave", and "Aurora 3D" are actually different titled and combined tracks from the albums Black Horse and MIDI Dungeon, both released by Vektroid under the alias esc 不在.

References

External links
Official website
Initiation Tape: Isle of Avalon Edition on Internet Archive

2011 albums
Vektroid albums
New-age albums
Vaporwave albums